The R406 road is a regional road in Ireland, linking the Straffan to Maynooth in County Kildare. 

It leaves the R403 near Straffan and heads north crossing the M4 motorway south of Maynooth. The road connects the K Club golf course which staged the 2006 Ryder Cup to the west and north of Dublin. 

See also
Roads in Ireland
National primary road
National secondary road

References
Roads Act 1993 (Classification of Regional Roads) Order 2006 – Department of Transport

Regional roads in the Republic of Ireland
Roads in County Kildare